Jim Stuebe is an American sound engineer. He was nominated for an Academy Award in the category Best Sound Mixing for the film 3:10 to Yuma. He has worked on over 60 films since 1978.

Selected filmography
 3:10 to Yuma (2007)

References

External links

Year of birth missing (living people)
Living people
American audio engineers